George Hamilton, 4th Baron Hamilton of Strabane (died 1668) was the younger son of Claud Hamilton, 2nd Baron Hamilton of Strabane. He succeeded to the title in 1655 when his brother drowned while bathing in the River Mourne. After the Restoration, he obtained the return of the family lands around Strabane, which had been confiscated by the Parliamentarians in 1650.

Birth and origins 
George was born in 1636 or 1637, probably at Strabane Castle. He was the younger son of Claude Hamilton and his wife Jean Gordon. His father was the 2nd Baron Hamilton of Strabane and a member of the Strabane cadet branch of the Abercorns. The lords of Strabane owned much land around Strabane and Baronscourt in County Tyrone.

George's mother was the fourth daughter of George Gordon, 1st Marquess of Huntly in Scotland. His parents were both Catholic. They married in 1632. He was one of four siblings, who are listed in his father's article.

Father's death 
In 1638, while George was still an infant, his father died and was buried in the church of Leckpatrick near Strabane. His older brother James succeeded as the 3rd Baron Hamilton of Strabane as a young child. His mother ran the family estate and they continued to live in the Castle of Strabane.

Irish wars 
In 1641, when George was about four years old, the Irish Rebellion broke out. The rebel leader Phelim O'Neill captured and burned Strabane Castle and took him, together with his mother and siblings, as prisoners to Kinard, his usual place of residence. Phelim released his prisoners after some days and sent them to Sir George Hamilton, one of George's uncles.

In 1649, when George was about 12, during the Irish Confederate Wars, Strabane Castle was attacked again, this time by Robert Monro and his Covenanter army. The castle was relieved by Phelim O'Neill, its previous attacker. Phelim married George's mother in November. Phelim became his stepfather and his half-brother Gordon O'Neill was born in due course.

In 1649 Oliver Cromwell invaded Ireland with the Parliamentarian forces. In July 1650, in the Siege of Charlemont, his brother and his stepfather defended Charlemont Fort with remnants of the Confederate Ulster army against a Parliamentarian army under Charles Coote. Having resisted several attacks, the fort finally surrendered to Coote on terms in August and the garrison was allowed to march away. In July 1650, the family's lands were confiscated by the Parliamentarians. In 1652 Phelim O'Neill was captured. He was tried and convicted for treason in October and executed.

Brother's succession 
In June 1655 his brother, James, drowned in the River Mourne at Ballyfathen, aged about 22. His brother had never married and George succeeded him as the 4th Baron Hamilton of Strabane. He is usually called Lord Strabane rather than Lord Hamilton to avoid confusion with the Lords Hamilton of the senior, Scottish, branch of the family.

Marriage and children 
George married in or before 1659 Elizabeth Fagan, daughter of Christopher Fagan of Feltrim, County Dublin, and of Anne, daughter of Sir Nicholas White of Leixlip Castle. Christopher Fagan had lost his estates during the Cromwellian conquest of Ireland but would get them back in 1663 as an "innocent papist" in the terms of the Act of Settlement 1662. Elizabeth would eventually turn out to be a rich heiress, the only surviving child after the deaths of her two brothers.

 
George and Elizabeth had two sons:
Claud (1659–1691), succeeded him as the 4th Earl of Abercorn
Charles (died 1701), became the 5th Earl of Abercorn

—and two daughters:
Anne (died 1680), married John Browne of the Neale, County Mayo
Mary (born 1668 or 1669), born after her father's death, and would marry as his second wife Garrett Dillon, Recorder of Dublin

Restoration 
After the Restoration (1660), Lord Strabane, as he was now, obtained the return of most of the family lands, which had been confiscated in 1650 by the Parliamentarians. Although his brother James had fought with Phelim O'Neill's Confederates rather than with the royalists, his brother had fought against the Parliamentarians, not against the royalists and, Lord Strabane, being born about 1636, was too young to have been involved in the atrocities of 1641. His brother's lands were therefore restored to him as an "innocent papist" on 16 May 1663.

Death, succession, and timeline 
He died on 14 April 1668 at Kenure House, Rush, Dublin, and was buried at nearby St. Mechlin's Church. He was succeeded by his eldest son Claud as 5th Baron Hamilton of Strabane, who in about 1680 became the 4th Earl of Abercorn.

Notes and references

Notes

Citations

Sources 

 
 
  – S to T (for Hamilton of Strabane)
  – Ab-Adam to Basing (for Abercorn)
  – Skemersdale to Towton (snippet view, for Strabane)
  – (for timeline)
  – Short biographies in the biographical notes
  – Viscounts
  – Abercorn to Balmerino
 

1630s births
1668 deaths
17th-century Irish people
People from County Tyrone
Barons in the Peerage of Ireland
George